Ice hockey at the 2009 European Youth Olympic Winter Festival was a men's ice hockey tournament played during the Silesia 2009 edition of the European Youth Olympic Festival (EYOF). It was held at the Tychy Winter Stadium in Tychy, Poland from 16 to 20 February 2009.

Results

Medal table

Medalists

References 

2009 European Youth Olympic Winter Festival
2009 in ice hockey
2009